Maritime and Commercial Court (Danish: Sø- og Handelsretten) is a specialized Danish court with jurisdiction over cases involving commercial law and maritime law. It was founded in 1861.

References

External links
 Official website

Organizations based in Copenhagen
1861 establishments in Denmark
Courts in Denmark
Denmark
Courts and tribunals established in 1861